Todor Bachvarov (born 8 January 1932) is a Bulgarian gymnast. He competed at the 1960 Summer Olympics and the 1964 Summer Olympics.

References

1932 births
Living people
Bulgarian male artistic gymnasts
Olympic gymnasts of Bulgaria
Gymnasts at the 1960 Summer Olympics
Gymnasts at the 1964 Summer Olympics
People from Yambol